HMS Valiant was the second ship of the  armoured frigates ordered by the Royal Navy in 1861. Her builders went bankrupt shortly after she was laid down, which significantly delayed her completion. After being launched in 1863, she waited a further five years to receive her guns due to supply issues. Upon being commissioned in 1868 the ship was assigned as the First Reserve guard ship for Southern Ireland, where she remained until she was decommissioned in 1885. Valiant was hulked in 1897 as part of the stoker training school HMS Indus before becoming a storeship for kite balloons during the First World War. The ship was converted to a floating oil tank in 1926 and served in that role until sold for scrap in 1956.

Design and description
They were modified versions of the Defence-class ships with additional armour and more powerful engines.
 
The ship was  overweight and displaced . The hull was subdivided by watertight transverse bulkheads into 92 compartments and had a double bottom underneath the engine and boiler rooms. While handy in manoeuvring, they rolled quite badly.

Propulsion

Valiant had one 2-cylinder horizontal-return connecting-rod steam engine made by Maudslay Sons & Field driving a single  propeller. The ship carried  of coal, enough to steam  at full speed.

Her funnel was semi-retractable to reduce wind resistance while under sail alone. She was designed to allow the ship's propeller to be hoisted up into the stern of the ship to reduce drag while under sail, but the hoisting gear was never fitted.

Armament
The armament of the Hector-class ships was intended to be 32 smoothbore, muzzle-loading 68-pounder guns, 15 on each side on the main deck and one each fore and aft as chase guns on the upper deck. This was modified during construction to eight rifled 110-pounder breech-loading guns and twenty-four 68-pounders. The breech-loading guns were a new design from Armstrong and much was hoped for them. Firing tests carried out in September 1861 against an armoured target, however, proved that the 110-pounder was inferior to the 68-pounder smoothbore gun in armour penetration and repeated incidents of breech explosions during the Battles for Shimonoseki and the Bombardment of Kagoshima in 1863–1864 caused the navy to withdraw the gun from service shortly afterwards. 

Due to her extended construction time, Valiant never received the breech loaders, and was armed with sixteen  and two  rifled muzzle-loading guns. The two 8-inch guns were mounted on the quarterdeck where they could be fought in all weathers and four 7-inch guns were also fitted on the upper deck. The remaining twelve 7-inch guns were carried on the main deck. It was credited with the nominal ability to penetrate  armour.

Armour
To protect against raking fire the belt was closed off by 4.5-inch transverse bulkheads at each end at lower deck level. The main deck was protected by a strake of armour that ran the full length of the ship. The lack of armour at the stern meant that the steering gear was very vulnerable.

Service history
HMS Valiant was laid down on 1 February 1861 by Westwood, Baillie in Cubitt Town. This company went bankrupt in November 1861 and was ultimately bought by Thames Ironworks, which delayed the ship's launching until 14 October 1863. In August 1865, after Valiant had been towed to Portsmouth for fitting out, the ship was inspected by French officers during a port visit by ironclads of the French Navy. Production of the new muzzle-loaded rifles was slow and ships already in commission had priority so Valiant was not commissioned until September 1868, nearly five years after she was launched.

After Valiant was commissioned she became the First Reserve guard ship in Southern Ireland, where she remained until 1885, an experience unique among the British ironclads, although she did have one break to have new boilers installed. From June to August 1878 the ship formed part of the Particular Service Squadron at the time of the Russian war scare during the Russo-Turkish War of 1877–1878, and sailed up the Dardanelles under the command of Admiral Hornby. On 20 July 1884 Valiant was accidentally rammed by the ironclad  in Lough Swilly, damaging her hull and tearing off her boats, davits and fittings on one side of the ship. Valiant was paid off in 1885, and saw no further front-line service; lying for thirteen years in a partially dismantled state at Devonport. In 1897 she was assigned to the stoker training establishment , briefly losing her name, before being renamed as Indus IV in 1904. The ship was converted to a kite balloon storeship in 1915, during World War I, and her name was changed to HMS Valiant III. She was offered for sale in 1922, but there were no takers so that she was converted into a floating oil tank in 1926 and towed to Hamoaze, where she remained until 1956. Valiant was sold in that year to Belgian ship breakers and towed to Bruges on 8 December 1956.

Notes

Footnotes

References

External links
 A Royal Maritime Museum engraving of HMS Valiant c. 1870
 1870s photograph of HMS Valiant from cyber-heritage.co.uk

 

Hector-class ironclads
1863 ships
Victorian-era battleships of the United Kingdom
Ships built in Cubitt Town